Mynyddislwyn was a civil parish and urban district in Monmouthshire, south east Wales. It was abolished in local government reorganisation in 1974. It is named for the Mountain in its centre MynyddIslwyn (Islwyn Mountain or Islwyn's Mountain, Islwyn being a Welsh Male name, meaning Below the Grove).

The ancient parish of Mynyddislwyn covered a large part of the lower Ebbw and Sirhowy Valleys. In 1894 the Crosskeys area was included in the urban district of Risca, and Abercarn was constituted a separate urban district.

The remainder of the parish was included in St Mellons Rural District, and included the hamlets of Fleur-de-Lis, Gelligroes, Penmain, Pontllanfraith and Ynysddu.

On October 1, 1903, Mynyddislwyn became an urban district. In 1926 it formed the West Monmouthshire Omnibus Board with neighbouring Bedwellty urban district, to maintain local ownership of local bus services. In 1935 the boundaries were adjusted with Bedwas and Machen and Bedwellty urban districts under a County Review Order.

Mynyddislwyn urban district was abolished in 1974, with its area passing to the borough of Islwyn, in the newly created administrative county of Gwent. Further local government reform in 1996 included the area in the county borough of Caerphilly.

St Tudor's church is part of the Benefice of Upper Islwyn, and has services on the first Sunday of every month.

References

External links
Mynyddislwyn - Portrait of a parish
Geograph - St Tudor's church

Geography of Caerphilly County Borough
History of Monmouthshire
Former subdivisions of Wales